The East Bend Generating Station is a coal-fired power plant owned and operated by Duke Energy near Rabbit Hash, Kentucky. It is located 10 miles west of Florence, Kentucky. The closest city is Rising Sun, Indiana, which lies to the northwest, across the Ohio River. Originally planned for four units, only unit no. 2 was built and is in commission.

Emissions data 
 2006  Emissions: 4,671,336 tons
 2006  Emissions: 3,947 tons
 2006  Emissions per MWh:
 2006  Emissions: 5,400 tons
 2005 Mercury Emissions: 86 lb.

See also 

 Coal mining in Kentucky

References

External links 
 http://www.epa.gov/osw/nonhaz/industrial/special/fossil/surveys/duke-eastbend.pdf

Energy infrastructure completed in 1981
Buildings and structures in Boone County, Kentucky
Coal-fired power plants in Kentucky
1981 establishments in Kentucky
Duke Energy